A coven is a gathering of witches.

Coven may also refer to:

 Coven the cat, The Cuddliest Cat In The World
Coven (band), an American rock band
Coven (1997 film), a 1997 American short horror film
Coven (2020 film), a 2020 Spanish drama film
The Coven (film), a 2015 UK horror film
American Horror Story: Coven, the third season of the US television series American Horror Story
Coven, Staffordshire, UK

See also
 Covan, Adrian Kowanek (born 1977), Polish death-metal vocalist